Return to Yugoslavia is a 1998 live album by English punk rock band Anti-Nowhere League.

Track listing
"For You"
"Snowman"
"Scum"
"Reck-A-Nowhere"
"Get Ready"
"I Hate People"
"The Great Unwash"
"Woman"
"Fucked Up and Wasted"
"Streets of London"
"We Are the League"
"Let's Break The Law"
"Burn 'em All"
"Can’t Stand Rock 'n' Roll"
"Long Live Punk"
"So What!"

Credits
 Animal (Nick Culmer) − vocals
 Magoo (Chris Exall) − guitar, backing vocals
 Beef − guitar, backing vocals
 JJ Kaos − bass, backing Vocals
 Revvin Taylor − drums

References

Anti-Nowhere League albums
1998 live albums